Wichita Town is a half-hour western television series starring Joel McCrea, Jody McCrea, Carlos Romero, and George Neise that aired on NBC from September 30, 1959, until April 6, 1960. 

Joel McCrea played Marshal Mike Dunbar, in charge of keeping the peace in the booming cattle town of Wichita, Kansas. His deputies were Ben Matheson, played by McCrea's real life son, Jody, and Rico Rodriquez, portrayed by Carlos Romero. Making occasional appearances were the town doctor, Nat Wyndham (played by George Neise), the blacksmith, Aeneas MacLinahan (played by Robert Anderson), and the bartender in the local saloon, Joe Kingston, played in six episodes by Robert Foulk.

The model for shows such as these had already been laid out by other western programs such as Gunsmoke, Lawman, and The Life and Legend of Wyatt Earp, so Wichita Town may not have been unique in its plotting and structure. The two most unusual features about the series were the presence of Joel McCrea, a favorite of Western film audiences for his performance in such films as Union Pacific, Buffalo Bill, and  Ramrod, and the fact that his real life son was in Wichita Town, but did not play his son. Wichita Town was produced by Mirisch Company and Joel McCrea's Production company for Four Star Television and aired for a single season.

Guest stars
Richard Coogan, formerly of NBC's The Californians, was cast as the Reverend Nichols in "The Devil's Choice" (1959).
Ben Cooper, as Tom Warren in "Passage to the Enemy"
Dennis Cross, as Fred Keever in "Second Chance" (1960)
Gene Evans, earlier of My Friend Flicka,  as Otis Stockert in "The Frontiersman" (1960)
Yvonne Lime Fedderson, as Fran in "Biggest Man in Town" (1959)
Frank Ferguson, as Mayor Eric Holbein in "The Night the Cowboys Roared" (1959) and "The Frontiersman (1960)
Jock Gaynor's first acting appearance was as Joe Malone in Wichita Town. Later that year he landed a supporting role on another NBC western, Outlaws.
Ron Hagerthy, formerly of Sky King, as Tod in "Biggest Man in Town" (1959)
Ron Hayes, as Scotty in the episode "Sidekicks"
I. Stanford Jolley, as Smokey, and John McIntire, as Frank Matheson prior to his Chris Hale starring role in Wagon Train, were cast together in the episode "Paid in Full".
Keith Larsen, star of NBC's Northwest Passage, appeared on Wichita Town in the role of the Indian, Blue Raven, in "Seed of Hate" (1960).
Nan Leslie, formerly of NBC's The Californians, cast on Wichita Town as Margaret Cook in "Day of Battle" (1959)
Suzanne Lloyd, as Laura in "Afternoon in Town" and "Sidekicks" (1960)
Mort Mills, as Pete Bennett in "Man on the Hill" (1959)
John M. Pickard, formerly of Boots and Saddles, appeared twice in episodes "Wyndham's Way" and as a character named Bain in the episode "Second Chance".
Robert F. Simon, as Walt McCloud in "Second Chance"

References

 McNeil, Alex. Total Television  (1996). New York: Penguin Books 
 Brooks, Tim and Marsh, Earle, The Complete Directory to Prime Time Network and Cable TV Shows (1999). New York: Ballantine Books

External links
 

1959 American television series debuts
1960 American television series endings
Black-and-white American television shows
NBC original programming
Television series by Four Star Television
Television series by MGM Television
Television series by 20th Century Fox Television
Television shows set in Kansas
1950s Western (genre) television series
1960s Western (genre) television series